ASC Linguère is a Senegalese football club based in Saint-Louis. It plays in the second division in Senegalese football. Its home stadium is Stade de Linguère.

Linguère is joint eighth in the number of major honours won in Senegal (five) with ASC Port Autonome of Dakar, Casa Sports of Ziguinchor and Djambars FC.

History
ASC Linguère was founded on 14 September 1969 after the merger of two clubs, Espoir de Saint-Louis and AS Saint-Louisienne.

Before the merger, Espoir de Saint-Louis won its only title under French rule in 1957. After independence, the club won its only cup title in 1961. AS Saint-Louisienne won its only cup title five years later in 1966.

ASC Linguère primarily competed in the national First Division until 1998 when it finished in the relegation zone in 13th position and remained until 2002. After being first in the Second Division, Linguère continued until two years later when it was 17th in the 2003-04 Second Division. Linguère returned in 2008 after being first again in the Second Division and became professional champion that year. Linguère finished first in group A with 34 points and scored 16 goals and advanced up to the finals. The club faced Casa Sport from Casamance in the southwest of the country. Both matches were scoreless and Linguère scored 4–2 in the penalty shoot-out to win its only championship title in the 2009 season. After the group system finished, Linguère finished 7th in 2013 and 8th in 2013–14. Linguère was 9th in 2014-15 -t he club scored 30 goals which was shared with the champion Douanes. The goal total was second behind NGB ASC Niarry Tally. Linguère finished 4th in the 2015–16 season and scored the most goals (32), one goal more than Diaraf. Linguère competed in the 2016–17 season. Its result was last place two rounds from the second round. It climbed for its survival in Ligue 1, reaching as high as 9th place at the 12th round. Its positions dropped and was 11th from rounds 13 to 21 with the exception of the 18th round where the club was 12th. The club finished 13th. Linguère was in the relegation zone. The Demba Diop stadium crush which occurred in the 2017 Senegalese League Cup final which demoted US Ouakam from Ligue 1 and the national competition. Linguère was relieved from relegation.

Its first appearance in the cup finals was in 1971 when Linguère beat ASC Diaraf of Dakar 2–0. Its second appearance was in 1984, where it played ASC Jeanne d'Arc and lost 1–0 in extra time. Its second cup title was their third appearance in 1988 after defeating Saltiques Rufisque 1–0. Two years later, Linguère defeated ASC Port Autonome, another Dakar club, 1–0 to claim its third cup title. Its next two final appearances were unsuccessful, losing to ASC Diaraf in 1993 (2-0) and to another Dakar club, AS Douanes (3-1), five years later. Tt played the same club in 2007, this time winning the cup title 1-0 after extra time. This was its recent cup final appearance.

Continental appearances
Espoir de Saint-Louis's only continental appearance was in 1965 when they played Stade Malien from the eastern neighbour of Senegal. The home match was a draw; the away match was lost 4–1.

Its first continental appearance after the 1969 merger was a cup competition in 1989. Linguère played ASF Bobo-Dioulasso of Burkina Faso and lost by the away goals rule. Its second also entered as a second place club and challenged Algeria's ES Sétif. The club won 1–0 in the first leg and lost 7–1 in the second. Its third cup competition was in 1997, as a second place club, against KAC Marrakesh and lost two legs by a goal each. Its recent continental cup challenge was the 2008 CAF Confederation Cup and challenged against ES Bingerville and each had a total of 3 goals. The club won its promotion in penalty shoot-outs 4-2 and next faced CS Sfaxien from eastern Tunisia; tied with a total of four goals, they lost under the away goals rule.

Its first championship title after the merger and foundation of the club was in 2009. Linguère played Casa Sport in the late-October finals and both matches ended without goals. The final match in the home stadium went into penalty shoot-outs and Linguère won 4–2 to claim its only national title. It gave Linguère an entry to the 2010 CAF Champions League, its only entry to the continental championships, and promotion to the first round. In the preliminaries, Linguère played Ghana's Asante Kotoko and two matches were tied 2-2 and defeated them in the penalty shoot-outs with four goals. Next came Mali's Djoliba AC, 2009 winner and whose title dominated about a quarter of the nation's championships. Linguére scored a single goal in one of the two matches and were tied. Linguère lost 3 penalty shoot-out goals to 4 to one of the greatest clubs in Mali.

Subcontinental appearance
At the WAFU Cup, the club competed in the 1988 edition where it lost in the first round to ASFAG Conakry 4–1 in the first match in June. The second match was scoreless.

Uniform

Its uniform colors are a white clothing with green lining along the collar and the top portion of the sleeves and the rest of the edges, and socks with three green stripes on top for home matches and green clothing with white line edges on top of the T-shirt with white shorts and green socks with three white stripes on top.

Its former uniform colors were purple for home matches and white for away matches.

Honours
Senegal Premier League: 1
 2009
Senegal FA Cup: 6
Espoir de Saint-Louis  (before the merger): 1
 1961
AS Saint-Louisienne (before the merger): 1
 1966
as ASC Linguère: 4
 1971, 1988, 1990, 2007

League and cup history

Performance in CAF competitions

Performance at the WAFU Club Championship

National level

Statistics
Best position: First round (continental)
Best position at cup competitions: First Round of 16 (continental)
Appearances at the League Cup: 9
Highest number of points in a season: 46 - national (2005)
Total matches played at the continental level: 14
CAF Champions' League: 4
CAF Confederation Cup: 8
CAF Cup: 2
Total goals scored: 14
CAF Champion's League: 3
CAF Confederation Cup: 11
Total wins at the CAF Confederation Cup: 3

Notable players
 Yacoub Ba
 El Hadji Diouf
 Amara Traoré

Notes

External links
 Official website 

 
Ligue 2 (Senegal) clubs
Saint-Louis, Senegal
Linguere
Association football clubs established in 1969
Linguere